Heart of the Wilds is a lost 1918 American silent drama film directed by Marshall Neilan and starring Elsie Ferguson. The story is from "Pierre and His People", by Gilbert Parker, which Edgar Selwyn also based his play Pierre of the Plains on. Ferguson had become a star in 1908 in Selwyn's Broadway play.

Cast
Elsie Ferguson as Jen Galbraith
Thomas Meighan as Sergeant Tom Gellatly
Joseph W. Smiley as Peter Galbraith (credited as Joseph Smiley)
Matt Moore as Val Galbraith
E. L. Fernandez as Pierre (billed Escamillo Fernandez)
Sidney D'Albrook as Grey Cloud

Reception
Like many American films of the time, Heart of the Wilds was subject to cuts by city and state film censorship boards. For example, the Chicago Board of Censors modified the plot of this film by requiring cuts in Reel 2 of Val drawing a gun from case, shooting Grey Cloud, and putting the gun away after the shooting, the cuts intending to eliminate the entire idea that the Indian was shot by Val. The board also cut, in Reel 4, Jen shooting Sergeant Tom Gellatly of the mounted police.

See also
Over the Border (1922)

References

External links

Lantern slide
image from the film; matches lobby poster litho
kinotv

1918 films
American silent feature films
Lost American films
Films based on works by Gilbert Parker
Films directed by Marshall Neilan
1918 drama films
Silent American drama films
American black-and-white films
Films based on short fiction
1918 lost films
Lost drama films
Censored films
1910s American films